Ouyang Yuqian (May 12, 1889 – September 21, 1962) was a Chinese playwright, Peking opera actor and writer, film screenwriter and director, and drama educator. He is considered by drama historians as one of the three founders of the modern Chinese spoken drama, together with Tian Han and Hong Shen. He was also one of the top Peking opera performers, regarded as a southern counterpart of Mei Lanfang.

Ouyang Yuqian was the founding president of the Central Academy of Drama from 1950 until his death in 1962. He also served as vice chairman of the China Federation of Literary and Art Circles, vice chairman of the Chinese Dramatists Association, and chairman of the Chinese Dancers Association.

Names
Ouyang Yuqian's name at birth was Ouyang Liyuan, and his hao was Nanjie. He also used the stage names and pen names including Lanrong, Liansheng,  and Taohua Buyi'an Zhu.

Early life and education
Ouyang Yuqian born on 12 May 1889 into a wealthy and highly educated family in Liuyang, Hunan Province. His father was Ouyang Ligeng, and mother Liu Yixia.  His grandfather Ouyang Zhonghu was a scholar who served as governor of Guilin Prefecture during the Qing dynasty.

When he was 15, Ouyang went to study in Japan. He graduated from Seijo School (成城学校) in Tokyo, and then studied business at Meiji University and literature at Waseda University.  In 1906, Ouyang and other Chinese students in Japan co-founded the Spring Willow Society (Chunliu She), which marked the beginning of modern Chinese theatre.

Career

Early career — Peking opera and drama 

He returned to China in 1911 and founded the New Play Comrade Society with his Spring Willow colleague Lu Jingruo. They later established the Spring Willow Theatre in Shanghai, but it went out of business when Lu died in 1915.

In 1914, Ouyang Yuqian began to write and act in Peking operas. From 1914 to 1928, he wrote 18 operas, and directed and performed in 29. He also adapted more than 50 traditional stories into Peking opera, including many from the classic novel Dream of the Red Chamber. His acting was so highly acclaimed that he was considered the southern counterpart of the master Mei Lanfang. In 1918, he was invited by Zhang Jian to establish an actors' school and the Gengsu Theatre in Nantong, Jiangsu.

Although a famous Peking opera performer, Ouyang was also active in promoting the "New Play" (spoken drama). He joined several New Play societies in the 1910s and co-founded several pioneering drama troupes, including the Masses Theatre Society, the Drama Cooperative Society, and the Southern Drama Society. During this period, he collaborated with like-minded dramatists and directors Hong Shen, Ying Yunwei, Zhang Shichuan, Zheng Zhengqiu, and Zhou Jianyun. In 1922, he wrote the play After Returning Home , considered one of the earliest satirical comedies in China. In his 1928 play Pan Jinlian, he depicted Pan Jinlian, the archetypal femme fatale of classical Chinese culture, as a free-spirited woman victimized by a male-dominated traditional society. He played the title role himself.

1920s and 1930s — film and drama 

After Zhang, Zheng, and Zhou started the Mingxing Film Company in 1922, they invited Ouyang Yuqian to join their studio, but Ouyang declined because, according to himself, he was earning a "substantial salary" as a Peking opera performer. He did help out on several occasions, but at the same time wrote three films for the rival China Sun Motion Picture Company from 1926 to 1928. He acted in two of the three films, Why Not Her? and A Wandering Songstress, and directed the third, Three Years Later.

In 1929, Ouyang Yuqian was invited by Chen Mingshu, chairman of Guangdong Province, to establish the Guangdong Drama Research Institute in Guangzhou. His political view turned increasingly left-wing, especially after the 1932 Japanese attack of Shanghai. He joined the Left-Wing Dramatist League in Guangzhou and participated in the first drama festival in the Soviet Union. In 1933, he joined Chen Mingshu's Fujian Rebellion, and was forced to escape to Japan after its failure.

After returning to Shanghai in 1934, Ouyang Yuqian joined Xinhua Film Company and wrote his first sound film New Peach Blossom Fan. In 1935, he joined Mingxing, by then one of the largest Chinese film studios, and helped the studio secure a crucial bank loan using his own family resources. He made three films with Mingxing: Qingming Festival, Xiao Lingzi, and Red Haitang.

Japanese invasion and Civil War 
Ouyang Yuqian joined Lianhua Film Company in 1937. While he was shooting the film So Busy, the Empire of Japan launched a full-scale invasion of Shanghai, which destroyed most of the city's film studios. After Japan occupied the Chinese sections of Shanghai, Ouyang made several anti-Japanese plays in the Shanghai International Settlement, before fleeing to British Hong Kong, where he wrote the screenplay for the patriotic film Mulan Joins the Army.

During the Second Sino-Japanese War, Ouyang Yuqian spent most of his time in Guilin, Guangxi in southwest China, which was largely free from Japanese occupation. He studied Guilin opera and established a school for the art. He established Guangxi Provincial Art Museum in 1940, and an art theatre 1944. In 1944, he and Tian Han organized the First Southwest Opera Expo in Guilin, which lasted three months and attracted almost a thousand performers.

After the surrender of Japan at the end of World War II, he returned to Shanghai in 1946 and served as the playwright-director of New China Drama Society. He also taught at Shanghai Experimental School of Drama. In January 1947, he led a delegation to perform in Taiwan, but had to leave when the February 28 Incident broken out. Because of the Chinese Civil War, Ouyang left again for Hong Kong, and worked as the screenwriter-director of Yonghua Film Company.

People's Republic of China 

In March 1949, he was invited by the Central Committee of the Chinese Communist Party to attend the first Chinese People's Political Consultative Conference. He was elected director of the Chinese National Opera Improvement Committee and a Standing Committee member of the China Federation of Literary and Art Circles.

Ouyang Yuqian became the founding president of Central Academy of Drama in April 1950. He joined the Chinese Communist Party in 1955. He also served as vice chairman of the China Federation of Literary and Art Circles, vice chairman of the Chinese Dramatists Association, and chairman of the Chinese Dancers Association. He was a member of the first National Committee of the Chinese People's Political Consultative Conference and the first and second National People's Congress.

In his later years, he published several memoirs and books on film and drama theory, and a book on Tang dynasty dances. On 21 September 1962, Ouyang Yuqian died of an illness in Beijing.

Personal life

Ouyang Yuqian married Liu Yunqiu, also known as Liu Wenqiu, in 1906. They had a daughter, Ouyang Jingru (13 September 1928–2013) and an adopted son Ouyang Shanzun (24 May 1914–2 July 2009), who was also a dramatist.

See also
Ouyang Yuqian Grand Theater, in Liuyang, Hunan

References

Bibliography

1889 births
1962 deaths
Male actors from Changsha
Chinese dramatists and playwrights
Film directors from Hunan
Chinese male Peking opera actors
Female impersonators in Peking opera
Writers from Changsha
Meiji University alumni
Waseda University alumni
Chinese film directors
20th-century Chinese dramatists and playwrights
Delegates to the 1st National People's Congress
Chinese silent film directors
20th-century Chinese  male  singers
20th-century Chinese male actors
Chinese expatriates in Japan
Dramatists of Chinese opera
Burials at Babaoshan Revolutionary Cemetery